Nephopterix angustella is a moth of the family Pyralidae described by Jacob Hübner in 1796. It is found in Europe.

The moth flies from May to October depending on the location.

The larvae feed on bird cherry.

External links
 Lepidoptera of Belgium
 Microlepidoptera.nl 
 Nephopterix angustella on UKMoths

Phycitini
Moths described in 1796
Moths of Europe